River Stour  may refer to:
River Stour, Dorset, a river in the English county of Dorset
River Stour, Kent, a river in the English county of Kent, and its upper reaches and tributaries:
River East Stour
River Great Stour
River Little Stour
River Stour, Suffolk, a river in the English counties of Suffolk and Essex
River Stour, Warwickshire, a river in the English county of Warwickshire
River Stour, Worcestershire, a river in the English county of Worcestershire
Stour Brook, in Suffolk and Essex, England
Stour River, in New Zealand

See also
Stour (disambiguation)